Jorge Gudiño (2 June 1920 – 1995) was a Mexican basketball player. He competed in the men's tournament at the 1948 Summer Olympics.

References

External links
 

1920 births
1995 deaths
Mexican men's basketball players
Olympic basketball players of Mexico
Basketball players at the 1948 Summer Olympics
Basketball players from Mexico City